Dryobalanops lanceolata is a species of plant in the family Dipterocarpaceae. The species name is derived from Latin ( = shaped like the head of a spear) and refers to the shape of the leaf. This species is endemic to Borneo. It is common in protected areas, although elsewhere it has suffered modest population decline due to logging and land conversion.

It is an immense emergent tree, up to 80 m tall, found in mixed dipterocarp forest on clay-rich soils. It is a heavy hardwood sold under the timber trade name kapur.

References

lanceolata
Endemic flora of Borneo
Trees of Borneo
Taxa named by William Burck
Flora of the Borneo lowland rain forests